Sun Li (died December 250 or January 251), courtesy name Deda, was a Chinese military general and politician of the state of Cao Wei during the Three Kingdoms period of China. He was from Rongcheng County, Zhuo Commandery, which is present-day Rongcheng County, Hebei. He was known for being generous, loyal and brave.

Later, regent of Wei named Cao Shuang giving Sun Li the rank of regional inspector (刺史) of Yang Zhou province (揚州) which located on northern Anhui and Jiangsu. Sun Li also bestowed with the title of General putting down the waves (伏波將軍) and  Marquis within the Passes (關內侯).

Later, Wu general named Quan Cong (全琮) invaded the region and prompted Sun Li to be sent to defend the area, where he meet Quan Cong in the battle of Shapo (芍陂). Sun Li managed to repel Quan Cong and prmoted as Chamberlain for the Palace Revenues (少府) and was made regional governor (牧) of the province of Jizhou (冀州) which are in modern time Shanxi.

After the Incident at the Gaoping Tombs which resulted in the execution of Cao Shuang, Sima Yi appointed Sun Li as metropolitan commandant and further giving him the honorific title of Minister of Works (司空) and  Neighbourhood Marquis of Dali (大利亭侯).

After his death, Sun Li were given a posthumous title as Marquis Jing (大利景侯).

See also
 Lists of people of the Three Kingdoms

Notes

References

 Chen, Shou (3rd century). Records of Three Kingdoms (Sanguozhi).
 Pei, Songzhi (5th century). Annotations to Records of the Three Kingdoms (Sanguozhi zhu).

Date of birth unknown
250 deaths
Cao Wei generals
Cao Wei politicians
Generals under Cao Cao
Han dynasty generals from Hebei
Han dynasty politicians from Hebei
Political office-holders in Anhui
Political office-holders in Hebei
Political office-holders in Henan
Political office-holders in Shandong
Political office-holders in Shanxi
Politicians from Baoding
Officials under Cao Cao